Jane Cooper (October 9, 1924 – October 26, 2007) was an American poet.

Awards
 Award in Literature from the American Academy of Arts and Letters
 Maurice English Poetry Award (1985)
 Shelley Memorial Award (1977)
 Bunting Institute of Radcliffe College - Fellowship
 Guggenheim Fellowship - (1960)
 Ingram Merrill Award
 National Endowment for the Arts - Fellowship
 Lamont Poetry Prize (1968) for The Weather of Six Mornings

Works
 The Blue Anchor; The Earthquake; Ordinary Detail; In the Last Few Moments Came the Old German Cleaning Woman; Rent; The Winter Road (Part 4); The Flashboat, Norton Poets online

Books
 The Weather of Six Mornings (1969), which was the Lamont Poetry Selection of The Academy of American Poets.
 Maps and Windows (1974)
 Scaffolding: Selected Poems (1993)
 Green Notebook, Winter Road (1994), which was a finalist for the Lenore Marshall Poetry Prize
 Flashboat: Poems Collected and Reclaimed (W. W. Norton & Company, 1999)

Edited
 Extended Outlooks: The Iowa Review Collection of Contemporary Women Writers (1982)
 The Sanity of Earth and Grass: Complete Poems of Robert Winner (1994)

Memories
 Memories of Jane Cooper, Denise Duhamel, American Poetry Review, May 12, 2008
 Memories of Jane Cooper part 2, Denise Duhamel, American Poetry Review, May 14, 2008

References

External links
 Jane Cooper (1924 – 2007),  The Poetry Foundation
 Jane Cooper, Poets.org
 Jane Cooper, Norton Poets

1924 births
2007 deaths
University of Wisconsin–Madison alumni
Iowa Writers' Workshop alumni
Poets Laureate of New York (state)
20th-century American poets